Jim or James Moroney may refer to:

 Jim Moroney (baseball) (1883–1929), American baseball player
 Jim Moroney (public servant) (1898–1965), Australian public servant and policy-maker
 James Moroney (born 1953), American, participated in Rowing at the 1976 Summer Olympics – Men's coxless four